Flory Jagoda (born Flora Papo; December 21, 1923January 29, 2021) was a Bosnian Jewishborn American guitarist, composer and singer-songwriter. She was known for her composition and interpretation of Sephardic songs, Judeo-Espanyol (Ladino) songs and the Bosnian folk ballads, sevdalinka.

Biography
Flory Jagoda was born Flora Papo on December 21, 1923, to a Bosnian Jewish family.  She grew up in the Bosnian towns of Vlasenica and her birth city of Sarajevo. She was raised in the Sephardic tradition in the musical Altarac family. Her mother, Rosa Altarac left her first husband and returned to the town of Vlasenica. There she met and married Michael Kabilio, and they settled in Zagreb, Croatia, where Kabilio owned a tie-making business.

When the Nazis invaded Yugoslavia in April 1941, her step-father (whom Flory referred to as her father) put 16-year-old Flory on a train to Split using false identity papers and removing the Jewish star from her coat. On the train she played her accordion ("hamoniku" in Serbo-Croatian) all the way to Split (at that time controlled by the Italians), with other passengers and even the conductor singing along; she was never asked for her ticket. Her parents joined her in Split several days later, and after a brief sojourn there they and other Jews who had escaped the Nazis were moved to various islands off the Croatian coast. Flory and her parents were sent to the island of Korčula, where they lived until fall 1943. Following the Italian capitulation, Jews on Korcula left by fishing boats for Bari, Italy, which had recently been liberated by the British army. While in Italy, she met and fell in love with an American soldier named Harry Jagoda.  She arrived in the United States as a war bride in 1946, going first to Harry's hometown of Youngstown, Ohio, and later moving to Northern Virginia.

The Sephardic community of Sarajevo and its surrounding communities were nearly obliterated during World War II.

Jagoda's recording Kantikas Di Mi Nona (Songs of My Grandmother) consists of songs her grandmother, a Sephardic folksinger, taught her as a young girl. Following the release of her second recording, Memories of Sarajevo, she recorded La Nona Kanta (The Grandmother Sings), songs she herself wrote for her grandchildren.

In her 90s, Jagoda has stated that Arvoliko: The Little Tree, released in 2006, would be her final solo recording. The tree, located in Bosnia, is said to be the only marker of the mass grave of 42 massacred members of the Altaras family. She referred to her four recordings as representing the four musical stages of her life. In 2006 she also released a series of duets with Ramón Tasat, Kantikas de amor i vida: Sephardic Duets.

Ladino, or Judeo-Espanyol, the language of the Sephardim, is in danger of extinction, but it is experiencing a minor revival among Sephardic communities, especially in music. Jagoda was a leader in this revival.

In 2002, Jagoda received a National Heritage Fellowship from the National Endowment for the Arts for her efforts in passing on the tradition of Sephardic songs sung in Ladino. In 2002, Ankica Petrovic produced a documentary film about her life. In the fall of 2013, a gala celebration concert honoring Flory's 90th birthday was held in Coolidge Auditorium at the Library of Congress. Jagoda was joined on stage by more than twenty of her students, colleagues, and family members. The concert was filmed by JEMGLO, which used portions of the concert interspersed with interviews with Jagoda, her family members, and several of her disciples and musical colleagues for the documentary Flory's Flame.  Her music is known and sung by many musicians around the world, but especially by her apprentice, Susan Gaeta, as a soloist and with Trio Sefardi (with Tina Chancey and Howard Bass), and by her student, Aviva Chernick.

The 2019 children's book The Key from Spain by Debbie Levy is a tribute to Jagoda's life and music.

Flory and her husband, Harry Jagoda, had four children. In later life, Jagoda developed dementia and was unable to sing. Flory Jagoda died age 97 on January 29, 2021.

Discography

Albums
 Kantikas Di Mi Nona (Songs of My Grandmother) (1988)
 Memories of Sarajevo
 La Nona Kanta (1992)
 Arvoliko (2006)
 Kantikas de amor i vida: Sephardic Duets (2006) Duets with Ramón Tasat

Video
  (documentary)
  (documentary)

Bibliography

See also 
 Judaeo-Spanish
 Sephardic Jews
 "Ocho Kandelikas"

References

External links
 Official website 
 
 
 
 Flory Jagoda: The Celebration Concert. 2013. Video. Retrieved from the Library of Congress

1923 births
2021 deaths
20th-century American singers
20th-century American women singers
21st-century American singers
21st-century American women singers
American people of Spanish-Jewish descent
Bosnia and Herzegovina people of Spanish descent
Bosnia and Herzegovina Sephardi Jews
Jewish American musicians
Jewish folk singers
Judaeo-Spanish-language singers
Musicians from Sarajevo
National Heritage Fellowship winners
Singers from Virginia
Yugoslav emigrants to the United States
Yugoslav Jews
Bosnia and Herzegovina emigrants to the United States
21st-century American Jews